Wanna Meet the Scruffs? is the debut studio album by American power pop band The Scruffs, released in 1977 by record label Power Play.

Track listing 
All tracks written by Stephen Burns, except where noted.
Side One
 "Break The Ice" — 2:33
 "My Mind" — 2:07
 "You're No Fun" — (Dave Branyan, Burns) — 2:29
 "Frozen Girls" — 3:00
 "I've Got A Way" — (Branyan, Burns) — 1:53
 "Tragedy" — 2:07
 "This Thursday" — 2:23
Side Two
 "Revenge" — 2:48
 "She Say Yea" — 2:47
 "Tommy Gun" — 3:48
 "Sad Cafe" — (Branyan, Burns) — 2:30
 "I'm A Failure" — 2:29
 "Bedtime Stories" — (Branyan, Burns) — 3:40

Personnel 
 Stehpen Burns _ lead vocals, rhythm guitar, piano, Arp synthesizer
 Dave Branyan — lead guitar, backing vocals
 Rick Branyan — bass, backing vocals, piano
 Zeph Paulson — drums, backing vocals

References

External links 
 

1977 debut albums